Vielbach is an Ortsgemeinde – a community belonging to a Verbandsgemeinde – in the Westerwaldkreis in Rhineland-Palatinate, Germany.

Geography

Vielbach lies 3 km south of Selters in the lower reaches of the kleiner Saynbach in the middle of woodlands and meadowlands. The community belongs to the Verbandsgemeinde of Selters, a kind of collective municipality. Its seat is in the like-named town.

History
In 1315, Vielbach had its first documentary mention. The name's spelling has changed over the centuries from Villebach to Vyllebach to Vielbach.

Politics

The municipal council is made up of 12 council members, as well as the honorary and presiding mayor (Ortsbürgermeister), who were elected in a majority vote in a municipal election on 13 June 2004.

Economy and infrastructure

The nearest Autobahn interchange is Mogendorf on the A 3 (Cologne–Frankfurt). The nearest InterCityExpress stop is the railway station at Montabaur on the Cologne-Frankfurt high-speed rail line.

References

External links
Vielbach 
Verbandsgemeinde of Selters 

Municipalities in Rhineland-Palatinate
Westerwaldkreis